"Why Do You Lie to Me" is a song by German producer Topic and Swedish singer A7S featuring American rapper Lil Baby. It was released as a single on 28 August 2020 by Virgin Records. The song was written by the three artists and produced by Topic.

Content
"Why Do You Lie to Me" is a melancholic dance track that starts with a calm instrumental and slowly builds up. It consists of an emotional piano melody, the harmonic voice of A7S and the ad-libs of Lil Baby. Topic mentioned it combined hip-hop and dance music and said to German radio 1LIVE: "Especially in these days when people have so much access to all the music out there, there are a lot more crossovers right now. It's always been fun doing different genres."

Music video
The music video was released on 2 November 2020 and directed by Dagi Bee. Topic, A7S, and TikTok creators Anna Klinski and Tim Schaecker appear in the video. It explores themes of love, loss and sensuality, painted a hazy picture of a party where reality and illusion blur.

Personnel
Credits adapted from Qobuz.
 Topic – production, mixing, drums, bass, synthesizer, programming 
 A7S – vocals, drums, piano
 Lil Baby – vocals
 Manuel Reuter – mastering

Charts

Weekly charts

Year-end charts

References

2020 songs
2020 singles
Topic (DJ) songs
Lil Baby songs
Songs written by A7S
Songs written by Lil Baby
Songs written by Topic (DJ)